Florent Vollant (born August 10, 1959 in Labrador) is a Canadian singer-songwriter. An Innu from Maliotenam, Quebec, he was half of the popular folk music duo Kashtin, one of the most significant musical groups in First Nations history. He has subsequently released four solo albums.

In 1997, Vollant built his own recording studio – Makusham – on the reserve which is used by musicians inside and outside the community. His solo album Puamuna, which means 'dreams' in Innu, was the first time Vollant recorded a full album in his own studio. His Innu-language album of Christmas songs, Nipaiamianan, earned him an apostolic blessing from Pope John Paul II, as well as the Juno Award for Aboriginal Recording of the Year in 2001.

In 2020, he served as executive producer of Call Me Human (Je m'appelle humain), Kim O'Bomsawin's documentary film about Innu poet Joséphine Bacon. He is also a mentor to Nikamu Mamuitun, a collective of emerging First Nations musicians including Marcie Michaud-Gagnon, Joëlle St-Pierre, Kanen, Chloé Lacasse, Scott-Pien Picard, Matiu, Cédrik St-Onge and Ivan Boivin.

He won the Félix Award for Indigenous Artist of the Year at the 41st Félix Awards in 2019.

Discography
 Katak (2003)
 Nipaiamianan (2005)
 Eku Mamu (2009)
 Puamuna (2015)
 Mishta Meshkenu (2018)

References

External links
 

1959 births
20th-century First Nations people
21st-century First Nations people
Canadian documentary film producers
Canadian folk singer-songwriters
Canadian male singer-songwriters
First Nations musicians
Innu people
Juno Award for Indigenous Music Album of the Year winners
Living people
People from Côte-Nord
Singers from Quebec
Félix Award winners